The Shakespeare Ladies Club (or Shakespeare Ladies' Club) refers to a group of upper class and aristocratic women who petitioned the London theatres to produce William Shakespeare's plays during the 1730s. In the 1700s they were referred to as "the Ladies of the Shakespear’s Club," or even more simply as "Ladies of Quality," or "the Ladies." Known members of the Shakespeare Ladies Club include Susanna Ashley-Cooper, Elizabeth Boyd, and Mary Cowper. The Shakespeare Ladies Club was responsible for getting the highest percentage of Shakespeare plays produced in London during a single season in the eighteenth century; as a result they were celebrated by their contemporaries as being responsible for making Shakespeare popular again.

History

The Shakespeare Ladies Club was organized in late 1736 with the expressed goal of persuading "London’s theatrical managers to give Shakespeare a greater share in their repertoires." The Ladies wanted to see more Shakespeare on stage because they preferred his plays to the inappropriate libertine content in Restoration comedies and the Italian operas that were dominating the London stage at the time. Within four years the Ladies’ Club had succeeded: one in every four performances in London during the 1740–41 season was a Shakespeare play. Shakespearean scholar Michael Dobson points out that this is "a record which even during Garrick’s professedly Bardolatrous management of Drury Lane was never challenged."

In addition to being responsible for the highest percentage of Shakespeare's plays performed in a single season during the eighteenth century, the Ladies’ Club was also responsible for Shakespeare's memorial statue in Poets' Corner in Westminster Abbey. Fundraising for the memorial statue began in 1738 and the statue was placed in Westminster Abbey in 1741. There were at least two benefit performances of Shakespeare plays done as part of the Ladies' Club's fundraising efforts. One was a performance of Julius Caesar on 28 April 1738 at Drury Lane. The other was a performance of Hamlet on 10 April 1739 at Theatre Royal, Covent Garden (also known as the Royal Opera House).

Recognition by contemporaries

In January 1737 every performance of a Shakespeare play at Theatre Royal, Drury Lane (except for one command performance of Hamlet for the Prince and Princess of Wales) was done "At the Desire of several Ladies of Quality." While such a heading was not unusual in the early eighteenth century, it is significant that it occurred for every performance that month. As the Ladies’ gained influence over Drury Lane their popularity and success began to be recognized in prologues to performances of new plays and new adaptations of Shakespeare's plays. For the premiere of The Universal Passion, an adaptation of Much Ado About Nothing by James Miller, the prologue included an "ecstatic eulogy of the Shakespeare Ladies Club":

Britannia thus, with Folly’s Gloom overcast,
Has slumb’ring lain near half a Cent’ry past,
But now what Joy! to find the Night is o’er!
To see the Lamp of Science shine once more;
To see the Reign of Farce and Dulness end,
And Albion’s noble Fair to Shakespear’s Sense attend.
     ‘Twas this gave Birth to our Attempt to-night,
Fond to bring more of his rich Scenes to light:
But conscious how unequal to the Task,
Our Bard scarce dares your Clemency to ask:
.     .     .     .
     To You, ye Fair, for Refuge now he flies
And as you smile or frown, he lives or dies:
You are the ablest Judges of this Play,
Since Love’s almighty Pow’r’s his Theme today:
To your Protection Shakespear’s Offspring take,
And save the Orphan for the Father’s Sake.

On 4 March 1737 the manager of the New Haymarket Theater added "a New Prologue in the Characters of Shakespear’s Ghost, the Squire, Mr. Student, and Mr. Bays, concluding with an address to the Ladies of the Shakespear’s Club" to a performance of Shakespeare's The Life and Death of King John.

The benefit performance of Julius Caesar on 28 April 1738 included an epilogue from James Noel which echoed "Miller's metaphor of the Ladies' Club as mothers" responsible for the birth of Shakespeare as the nation's poet:

 But here what humble thanks, what praise is due,
Ow'd to such gen'rous virtue, ow'd to you!
With grief you saw a bard neglected lie,
Whom towring genius living raised so high.
With grief you saw your Shakespeare's slighted state,
And call'd forth merit from the grave of fate.
Let others boast they smile on living worth;
You give a buried bard a brighter birth.

In addition to prologues the Shakespeare Ladies Club was also recognized in the daily newspapers. On 3 March 1737 the Grub Street Journal printed a letter from the ghosts of Shakespeare, Ben Jonson, John Dryden, and Nicholas Rowe to the theatre going public praising the Shakespeare Ladies Club for encouraging common sense and setting a good example for the gentlemen. The next day, 4 March 1737, the Daily Advertiser published a letter from Shakespeare's ghost "to the Fair Supporters of Wit and Sense, the Ladies of Great Britain." In this letter Shakespeare's ghosts praises the Ladies Club for their good taste and thanks them for forming the club and reviving "the Memory of the forsaken Shakespear."

David Garrick
David Garrick, the famous actor and theatre manager of Theatre Royal, Drury Lane, is often cited as the man responsible for Shakespeare's popularity in the eighteenth century. Garrick himself acknowledged the importance of the Ladies’ Club in a speech delivered at the Shakespeare Jubilee in 1769. In the speech Garrick said "It was You Ladies that restor’d Shakespeare to the Stage you form’d yourselves into a Society to protect his Fame, and Erected a Monument to his and your own honour in Westminster Abbey."

Eliza Haywood

From April 1744 to May 1746 Eliza Haywood anonymously published The Female Spectator, a monthly periodical which was the first magazine by and for women. While discussing the arguments for and against attending theatre in The Female Spectator, Haywood references the Shakespeare Ladies’ Club's efforts to raise money for Shakespeare's memorial statue in Westminster Abbey as well as their work to see more of Shakespeare's plays produced:

Some ladies indeed have shewn a truly public Spirit in rescuing the admirable, yet almost forgotten Shakespear, from being totally sunk in oblivion:—they have generously contributed to raise a monument to his memory, and frequently honoured his works with their presence on the stage:—an action, which deserves the highest encomiums, and will be attended with an adequate reward; since, in the preserving the fame of the dead bard, they add a brightness to their own, which will shine to late posterity.

Known members

Susanna Ashley-Cooper, The Countess of Shaftesbury

Susanna Ashley-Cooper, The Countess of Shaftesbury, was "a well-known and highly regarded figure in London society." She was active in artistic circles and supported Handel. She was the first wife of Anthony Ashley Cooper, 4th Earl of Shaftesbury and the daughter of Baptiste Noel, Earl of Gainsborough. Ashley-Cooper was identified as the leader of the Ladies’ Club by Thomas Cooke (author) in a poem published in 1743. The poem was titled An Epistle to the Right Honourable The Countess of Shaftesbury, with a Prologue and Epilogue on Shakespeare and his Writings. The prologue to the epistle was also performed by David Garrick at the Theatre Royal, Drury Lane.

Elizabeth Boyd

Elizabeth Boyd (1727–1745) was an active writer during the first half of the eighteenth century. Her play, Don Sancho: or, The students whim…with Minerva’s triumph, a masque (1739), references the Ladies’ Club's plans "to erect Shakespeare’s statue as a bid to capture Shakespeare’s ghost." The play takes place in an Oxford College garden where Don Sancho conjures Shakespeare's ghost. Although Don Sancho was never performed it was given a reading in the green room of Drury Lane Theatre. In the play Boyd also expresses the Ladies’ Club's goal of seeing Shakespeare's plays replace Restoration comedies with inappropriate content: "And once again let Shakespear bless the Stage; / Soul-Soothing Shade, rouz’d by a Woman’s Pen, To Check the impious Rage of lawless Men."

Mary Cowper

The Mary Cowper who was a member of the Shakespeare Ladies’ Club was the daughter of William Cowper, 1st Earl Cowper, and an elder cousin of the famous poet William Cowper. She married William de Grey, 1st Baron Walsingham in 1743. Mary Cowper recorded her involvement with the Shakespeare Ladies’ Club in a poem titled "On the Revival of Shakespear’s Plays by the Ladies in 1738," which was preserved in the Cowper Family Miscelany. The poem was reprinted in full in Michael Dobson's The Making of the National Poet.

Notes

References

 Avery, Emmett L. (1956). "The Shakespeare Ladies Club". Shakespeare Quarterly 7 (2): 153–158.
 .
 

William Shakespeare
18th-century British women
18th-century English writers
18th-century English poets
English dramatists and playwrights
English women poets
Reception of writers
History of women in the United Kingdom
Women in London
Women's clubs
18th century in women's history